Nattriss Point is a rocky headland forming the eastern end of Saunders Island in the South Sandwich Islands. First charted in 1819 by a Russian expedition under Fabian Gottlieb von Bellingshausen, it was re-charted in 1930 by DI personnel on the Discovery II and named by them for E.A. Nattriss, shipping officer to the Discovery Committee.

See also
Ashen Hills

References
 

Headlands of Antarctica